Snurråsen is a village in Siljan municipality, Norway. Its population is 336.

References

Villages in Vestfold og Telemark